Draupadi is a character in the Hindu epic Mahabharata.

Daupadi or Draupathi may also refer to: 

Draupadi (1931 film)
Draupadi (TV series), an Indian television mythological series
Draupathi (2020 film)

People with the name

 Draupadi Ghimiray, Indian social activist
Draupadi Murmu (born 1958), Indian politician and 15th President of India

See also